Carlos Alberto Souto Pinheiro Júnior or simply Carlos Alberto (born January 8, 1984 in Arês-RN), is a Brazilian footballer, who currently plays for Vitória.

References

1984 births
Living people
Brazilian footballers
Cruzeiro Esporte Clube players
Esporte Clube São Bento players
Club Athletico Paranaense players
Esporte Clube Bahia players
Esporte Clube Vitória players
Association football defenders